Lypetske, is a village in Podilsk Raion, Odesa Oblast, Ukraine. It belongs to Podilsk urban hromada, one of the hromadas of Ukraine. The population is 3740 people.

History 
According to data for 1859 in the state village of Ananyiv District of Kherson Province lived 2542 people (1288 males and 1254 - females), there were 428 households, there was an Orthodox Church.

As of 1886, the former state village of Gandrabur Parish had 3,039 inhabitants, 589 yards, and an Orthodox church and school.

According to the 1897 census, the population grew to 5,446 (2,740 males and 2,706 females), of whom 5,188 were Orthodox.

At least 415 villagers died during the Soviet Holodomor of 1932–1933.

According to the 1989 census of the Ukrainian SSR, the current population of the village was 4,627, of whom 2,028 were men and 2,599 women.

According to the 2001 census of Ukraine, 3740 people lived in the village.

On 24 February 2022, during the Russian invasion of Ukraine, a military facility in Lipetske was bombed by the Russian military, resulting in the death of 18 people.

Language 
Population distribution by mother tongue according to the 2001 census:

Notable people 

 Kirill Ilyashenko (1915–1980), Soviet Moldavian politician
 Vasyl Spinatiev (1920–after 1970), Soviet and Ukrainian cinematographer

References 

Villages in Podilsk Raion
Romanian communities in Ukraine